Hutch Dano (born May 21, 1992) is an American actor, painter and plastic artist. He is known for playing co-lead character Zeke Falcone in the Disney Channel comedy series Zeke and Luther.

Early life

Dano was born in Santa Monica, California. He comes from a family of actors, including his father Rick Dano and grandfather Royal Dano. His great-grandmother Virginia Bruce was an actress in the 1930s and 1940s and his great-grandfather J. Walter Ruben was a writer and director.

Career 
Dano was cast in his first commercial at the age of five, when his mother and father, also actors, took him along to their commercial audition. Dano began doing summer theater for four years before being discovered by casting director Orly Sitowitz at the age of 15.  He started taking acting classes with Gary Marks and also with Jorge Luis Pallo at the Scott Sedita Studios.

Dano was booked for the lead role of Zeke in the pilot episode of Zeke and Luther (2009) for Disney's XD Channel. After wrapping his first season, Hutch booked the role of Henry, starring opposite Selena Gomez in the 20th Century Fox feature Ramona and Beezus (2010), playing Beatrice "Beezus" Quimby's friend Henry Huggins. Dano also guest-starred on Disney Channel's The Suite Life on Deck (2008).

Dano guest starred on Law and Order: LA in 2010, for which he received a nomination in the 32nd Young Artist Awards in the Guest Starring Young Actor 18-21 category for a performance in a TV series. He also appeared in an episode of White Collar in 2011. In 2014, Dano played the role of Sam, the cheating boyfriend who gets his just reward in the horror comedy Zombeavers.

Since 2014 he has focused as painter and plastic artist as his main career. In 2017, he featured in the horror movie Behind the Walls. In 2019, Dano starred in the film Hoax, and in the film Disappearance, which he also co-wrote.

Filmography

Film

Television

Web

References

External links

1992 births
21st-century American male actors
American male child actors
American male television actors
Living people